Meghri Fortress, is an 11th-century Armenian fortress located in the town of Meghri, located on a hill overlooking the old section of the town from the north. Built in 1083, the fortress was founded during the 11th century and entirely rebuilt during the 18th century.

References

Archaeological sites in Armenia
Castles in Armenia
Forts in Armenia
Tourist attractions in Syunik Province
Buildings and structures in Syunik Province
Buildings and structures completed in the 11th century
Buildings and structures completed in the 18th century